Thayer School of Engineering at Dartmouth (Dartmouth Engineering) offers graduate and undergraduate education in engineering sciences at Dartmouth College, Hanover, New Hampshire, United States. The school was established in 1867 with funds from Colonel and Brevet Brigadier Sylvanus Thayer, a Dartmouth alumnus also known for his work in establishing an engineering curriculum at the United States Military Academy at West Point, New York. Located in a three-building complex along the Connecticut River on Dartmouth's campus, the school offers undergraduate, master's, and doctoral degrees, as well as dual-degree programs with institutions throughout the US.

In 2016, Dartmouth Engineering became the first US national research university, where more than 50 percent of the graduating class to earn undergraduate engineering degrees were women.

History 
Thayer School is named for Sylvanus Thayer, an alumnus of Dartmouth in the class of 1807. Thayer was known as the "Father of West Point" for his 16-year superintendency of West Point's United States Military Academy, where he developed an extensive engineering curriculum unlike any other in the United States at the time.  In 1867, after 30 years of professional service in the Army Corps of Engineers, Thayer endowed Dartmouth College with $40,000 (and increased the gift to $70,000 by 1871) for the establishment of a school of engineering, initially called the Thayer School of Civil Engineering.

The school officially opened in 1871, with six students.  The curriculum borrowed heavily from the model which Thayer himself had developed at West Point; graduates of the two-year program were awarded a degree in civil engineering (C.E.). Though Robert Fletcher, the first director and dean of the school, was also its only instructor for several years, the enrollment, funding, and faculty of the School increased markedly throughout the late 19th and early 20th centuries.

Under the administration of Frank Warren Garran (dean of the School from 1933 to 1945), Thayer experienced extensive expansion and modernization. Thayer's curriculum expanded to incorporate mechanical engineering and electrical engineering, as well as a dual business/engineering administration degree from the Tuck School of Business.  Garran also oversaw the establishment of Cummings Hall, the Thayer School's first dedicated physical plant, and the institution of the school's first major research program, which was in radiophysics.  Dean William P. Kimball (1945–61) continued the school's growing emphasis on research and established the first master's degrees for students wishing to earn more than a Bachelor of Engineering.

In 1961, Myron Tribus became dean of the School, placing a heavy emphasis on the practical, problem-solving aspects of engineering as well as the traditional, theoretical base of the discipline. Tribus developed an integrated curriculum and introduced design courses to the school to provide Thayer students with real-life experience in creative applications of engineering. Under Tribus, the Thayer School offered its first doctorates in engineering.

From the 1970s to the first decade of the 21st century, the Thayer School saw expansion into new fields such as nanotechnology and biochemical engineering, as well as collaboration with such nearby institutions as Dartmouth Medical School, the Dartmouth-Hitchcock Medical Center, and the Cold Regions Research and Engineering Laboratory. In the early first decade of the 21st century, the core curriculum for undergraduates was revamped under Dean Lewis Duncan (1998–2004), making the school's offerings more accessible to non-major Dartmouth students. The MacLean Engineering Sciences Center (ESC), completed in 2006, was a $21 million project to expand the school's classrooms and research centers.

Campus 

The Thayer School is located on the campus of Dartmouth College, which is situated in the rural, Upper Valley New England town of Hanover, New Hampshire. The campus of the Thayer School sits in a complex on the west side Dartmouth's campus near the Connecticut River. When classes first began in 1871, Sylvanus Thayer's endowment had not provided for a physical plant. Consequently, the school was an itinerant institution for many years, occupying parts of various College buildings and, at one point, a former structure of the New Hampshire College of Agriculture and the Mechanic Arts.

In 1938, Dartmouth president Ernest Martin Hopkins successfully lobbied the Board of Trustees to construct an independent facility for the school. $200,000 were spent to build Horace Cummings Memorial Hall, which with several major additions (built in 1945-46 and 1989) served as Thayer's only facility for nearly 70 years. In 2004, construction began on the MacLean Engineering Sciences Center (ESC), which was completed in 2006. At the cost of nearly $21 million, the new center adds both classroom and research space to the Thayer School.

The Thayer School shares the Murdough Center (containing the Feldberg Business & Engineering Library) with the adjacent Tuck School of Business.

Academics 
The Thayer School serves as both Dartmouth College's undergraduate department of engineering, as well as a graduate school offering advanced degrees. Undergraduate majors can receive their Bachelor of Arts degree in engineering at the school, and may choose to continue on to earn a Bachelor of Engineering (B.E.) degree in an additional year or less. Thayer also offers a dual-degree program for undergraduates at other colleges who wish to earn their bachelor's degree at their home institution and their B.E. at Thayer. As a college academic department, the school's undergraduate offerings are open to any Dartmouth student, including non-majors.

Thayer offers several graduate degree programs, including a Master of Engineering (M.Eng) in Biomedical Engineering, Master of Science (M.S.), and Doctor of Philosophy (Ph.D.) in engineering. The school also offers a Master of Engineering Management (M.E.M.) degree in conjunction with the adjacent Tuck School of Business, and a combination Ph.D/Doctor of Medicine (M.D.) from Dartmouth Medical School. The school also has the United States' first engineering Ph.D. Innovation Program.

Research and entrepreneurship 
The Thayer School emphasizes the cross-disciplinary nature of its research topics. In 2007, sponsored research at the school amounted to $16.2 million. Research at Thayer is divided into three general "focus areas": engineering in medicine, energy technologies, and complex systems. Projects within each focus area are divided by three "research categories": biomedical, biochemical, chemical & environmental engineering (BBCEE), electrical & computer engineering, & engineering physics (ECEEP), and materials & mechanical systems engineering (MMSE).

The Thayer School promotes its connections to engineering entrepreneurship. The Cook Engineering Design Center, founded in 1978, acts to solicit industry-sponsored projects for degree candidates to work on. The school also offers a variety of conferences, programs, and internships to foster student connections to the professional world. Companies and products that have emerged from the Thayer School include emeritus professor Robert Dean's Creare, Inc. and Dartmouth music professor Jon Appleton's work on the Synclavier synthesizer. The school maintains a list of startup companies established by its current faculty.

Rankings and admissions 
In 2007, the Thayer School was ranked 47th by U.S. News & World Report among American engineering schools. It was also included in BusinessWeek's unranked list of 60 "Best Design Schools in the World".

Admissions for undergraduate students are handled by Dartmouth College's Office of Undergraduate Admissions. Admission to graduate programs, including the B.E. degree, requires an undergraduate background in engineering and mathematics or science. In the fall of 2006, Thayer accepted 14.5% of applicants overall. Average Graduate Record Examination (GRE) test scores of applicants in verbal, quantitative, and analytical sections were 601, 778, and 695, respectively.

People

Student profile and student life 

As of the 2007–2008 academic year, the Thayer School has an enrollment of 354 students: 107 undergraduates, 62 doctoral candidates, 27 B.E. students, 76 M.E.M. students, 20 M.S. students, and 13 student pursuing special studies. The school offers a number of professional and community service student groups, as well as social life governance councils for the student body.

Faculty 

The Thayer School currently claims 74 active instructors, including 29 tenured or tenure-track faculty, 16 research or instructional faculty, 22 adjunct faculty members, and seven lecturers. Notable former faculty include Arthur Kantrowitz, emeritus professor of engineering, and Myron Tribus, the dean of the Thayer School for most of the 1960s. In 2020, the Thayer School introduced a new position, Associate Dean of Diversity and Inclusion, to help Thayer's current and future efforts in diversity and inclusion.  Petra Bonfert-Taylor was named to this position in August 2020.

Alumni 

As of 2007, Thayer has 4,046 engineering alumni in all 50 U.S. states and over 50 countries. Nearly 3,000 of the graduates received a B.E. or a graduate degree, with the remaining 1,000 earning only the undergraduate A.B. degree. The school claims that over 90% of graduates become employed within six months of graduation.

Notes

References 

Kimball, William Phelps (1971). The First Hundred Years of Engineering at Dartmouth College. The University Press of New England, Hanover, NH

External links 

Thayer School of Engineering
Thayer's Flickr Photostream Page

 
Engineering schools and colleges in the United States
Engineering universities and colleges in New Hampshire
Educational institutions established in 1867
1867 establishments in New Hampshire
Dartmouth College